Niko Kukka (born 30 September 1987) is a Finnish professional football defender who currently plays for the Veikkausliiga side MYPA in Finland.

Kukka started his footballing career at local HJK, but never got past its reserves. He was signed by rivals FC Honka for the 2007 season, but as he only managed to play a handful of games for the Espoo based club, he was loaned out to Ykkönen side Atlantis FC for the rest of the season.

After leaving FC Honka in 2008, Kukka joined AC Oulu and played a crucial part for the team as they won the promotion to Veikkausliiga for the 2009 season. After being a first choice left back for Oulu for three years, Kukka decided to join MYPA. On 17 November 2010, he signed a one-year deal with the club.

References

1987 births
Living people
Finnish footballers
Finland youth international footballers
Myllykosken Pallo −47 players
AC Oulu players
FC Honka players
Veikkausliiga players
Footballers from Helsinki
Klubi 04 players
Association football fullbacks
21st-century Finnish people